(born 16 August 1963) is a professional Japanese wheelchair Paralympic athlete from Suzuka, Mie, Japan, and a former entrepreneur.

Biography 

1998 During a business trip, he fell down and was diagnosed with multiple sclerosis. During his first treatment, he placed the order for a racing wheelchair by mistake. This mistake triggered him to start competing.
2002 He founded a non-profit organization, "Gold Athlete" to support athletes of disabled sports.
2004 Attended the 2004 Summer Paralympics, in Athens
2005 Became a professional athlete. He was enlisted to the Hall of Fame at The Museum of Marathon in Greece. He was the first Paralympic athlete to be enlisted.
2008 won two gold medals at 2008 Summer Paralympics in Beijing. He also marked the world record at Men's T52 800m round 1.

Biography References

Mie TV "Tottemo Waku-doki" on 6, October, 2008
Cable Net Suzuka "Ito Tomoya Beijing Paralympic Special Program" in Oct 2008

Records 

400m T52 57.25  Japan National Record
800m T52 1:52.31 World Record
Marathon T52 1:52:36

As of December 2008

References

External links
Tomoya Ito Official Web Site

Athletes (track and field) at the 2004 Summer Paralympics
Athletes (track and field) at the 2008 Summer Paralympics
1963 births
Paralympic athletes of Japan
Paralympic gold medalists for Japan
Sportspeople from Mie Prefecture
Living people
World record holders in Paralympic athletics
Medalists at the 2008 Summer Paralympics
Medalists at the 2012 Summer Paralympics
Athletes (track and field) at the 2012 Summer Paralympics
Paralympic silver medalists for Japan
People with multiple sclerosis
Paralympic medalists in athletics (track and field)
Athletes (track and field) at the 2020 Summer Paralympics